Dr. Shambhu Sharan Shrivastava is a Bihar politician who was a former leader of Samata Party (now led by Uday Mandal its President) and Janata Dal (United). He was sacked from the Janata Dal (United) in 2011 due to anti party activities. He was member of Bihar Legislative Council. Later he formed the Lok Aawaz Dal party. He is a former president of the All India Students Federation.

References

Living people
Year of birth missing (living people)
Place of birth missing (living people)
Bihari politicians
Samata Party politicians
Janata Dal (United) politicians